Demna Gvasalia (born 25 March 1981), known as Demna is a Georgian fashion designer, currently the creative director of Balenciaga and the co-founder of Vetements.

Early life and education
Demna was born in Georgia in 1981, to a Georgian Orthodox Christian family of Georgian father and Russian mother. He fled at age 12, during the 1992-1993 Abkhazo-Georgian war in Abkhazia, and was forced to live in Tbilisi. His family lived in Düsseldorf from 2001 onwards.

Demna studied international economics for four years at Tbilisi State University and later attended the Royal Academy of Fine Arts in Antwerp, where he graduated with a Master's degree in Fashion Design in 2006.

Career
In 2006, Demna collaborated with Walter van Beirendonck on his men’s collections.

In 2009, Demna joined Maison Martin Margiela, where he was responsible for women’s collections until 2013. In 2013, he was appointed senior designer of women’s ready-to-wear collections at Louis Vuitton, initially under Marc Jacobs and briefly under Nicolas Ghesquière.

Together with his brother Guram, Demna launched the brand Vetements in 2014, along with a small group of anonymous friends, displaying their work in small gay clubs in Paris. Demna has said that his original purpose with the brand was to subvert the high fashion status quo. Vetements’ first women’s ready-to-wear collection was presented at Paris Fashion Week in 2014. The collective was nominated for the LVMH’s Young Fashion Designer Prize after producing 3 collections.

In 2015, Demna became the creative director of Balenciaga, succeeding Alexander Wang.

In 2019, Demna left Vetements to pursue new artistic ventures, having accomplished his goals with the company, telling Highsnobiety that he had "accomplished [his] mission of a conceptualist and design innovator."

In August 2021, Demna collaborated with Kanye West, acting as the creative director for West’s second Donda album listening event, held at the Mercedes-Benz Stadium.

At the 2021 Met Gala at New York City's Metropolitan Museum of Art Demna walked the stairs with reality television star Kim Kardashian, both in his head-to-toe body feature obscuring Black Balenciaga designs completely masked, with Vogue offering that events rules had been rewritten.

In November of 2022 Balenciaga dropped its holiday ad campaign, featuring children holding teddy bears in bondage harnesses and costumes, as well a photo that included an excerpt of a document from a court ruling relating to child pornography. The backlash against the images has been swift, with the hashtag #cancelBalenciaga trending across Twitter and TikTok and many accusing the brand and  Demna of condoning pedophilia and child exploitation.

Design 
Demna developed a unique style as his company, Vetements, grew in size and popularity. Much of Demna's approach still stems from his initial purpose of creating subversive fashion. Collections such as Fall/Winter 2017 included design inspired by archetypes, diverging from the typical haute couture method of radical redesign and avant-garde appearance. Other common themes include baggy, loose-fitting clothing, and street-style jackets.
In April 2021 he presented his new Pre-Fall 2021 collection with the Balenciaga brand, marking a new line of design and personal thinking, as promoted by Vanity Teen magazine.

Awards
Demna won the International Award for Vetements and Balenciaga at the CFDA Fashion Awards in 2017. He also won the Accessories Designer of the Year award at the Fashion Awards 2018  Gvasalia won the Global Women’s Designer award at the CFDA Fashion Awards in 2021. On September 27, 2021, Georgian President Salome Zourabichvili awarded Demna with the Order of Honor for his contributions to the popularization of Georgia abroad.

See also 
David Koma, Georgian fashion designer, former creative director of Mugler

References

Living people
LGBT people from Georgia (country)
LGBT fashion designers
Fashion designers from Georgia (country)
Royal Academy of Fine Arts (Antwerp) alumni
Businesspeople from Tbilisi
Georgian emigrants to Germany
1981 births
Kering people
21st-century LGBT people
21st-century businesspeople
Tbilisi State University alumni
Recipients of the Order of Honor (Georgia)